Southport Landing may refer to:
Southport Landing, California
Southport, Maine